Paup or PAUP may refer to:
 PAUP*, a computer program for phylogenetics

people
 Donald C. Paup  (born 1939), former American badminton player